Union Township is one of nine townships in Wells County, Indiana, United States. As of the 2010 census, its population was 2,138 and it contained 799 housing units.

Geography

Cities, towns, villages
 Markle (southeast edge)
 Uniondale (southeast half)
 Zanesville (north half)

Adjacent townships
 Lafayette Township, Allen County (north)
 Pleasant Township, Allen County (northeast)
 Jefferson Township (east)
 Lancaster Township (southeast)
 Rockcreek Township (south)
 Rock Creek Township, Huntington County (southwest)
 Jackson Township, Huntington County (northwest)

Cemeteries
The township contains these four cemeteries: Hoverstock, Saint Johns, Uniontown and Old Uniontown.

School districts
 Northern Wells Community Schools

Political districts
 Indiana's 3rd congressional district
 State House District 50
 State Senate District 19

References
 United States Census Bureau 2007 TIGER/Line Shapefiles
 United States Board on Geographic Names (GNIS)
 IndianaMap

External links
 Indiana Township Association
 United Township Association of Indiana

Townships in Wells County, Indiana
Fort Wayne, IN Metropolitan Statistical Area
Townships in Indiana